Absolute Radio Country is a British digital radio station, and is owned and operated by Bauer Radio. It is available in selected areas via DAB, and across the U.K. online, on Smart Speaker and also via the Absolute Radio App as part of the Absolute Radio Network.

History
The station originally launched as Country Hits Radio on 5 April 2019 and was positioned as the UK's first national country music radio station. The station is focused on modern country music and is aimed at listeners of 25–44. RAJAR for Early 2020 puts the station on an average of 257k listeners per week. Absolute Radio Country is available on DAB in London, Birmingham, Manchester, Liverpool, Leeds, South Yorkshire, North Yorkshire, Lancashire, East Yorkshire, Tyne & Wear, Teesside, Glasgow, Edinburgh, Tayside, Inverness and Ayr. In 2021, it was also made available on digital radio in Bristol and Bournemouth.

In February 2021 Bauer revealed that the station would be renamed as Absolute Radio Country and made part of the Absolute Radio Network - the transition took place on 17 May 2021, in tandem with other changes to the availability of Absolute's digital stations. The first song to be played after the launch was "Jolene" by Dolly Parton, which was chosen by listeners via social media.

In June 2022, a sister station called Absolute Radio Classic Country was added to Bauer's Absolute Radio Premium subscription streaming package.

Programming
Absolute Radio Country programming primarily comes from their studios in London as part of the Absolute Radio Network. From Sunday - Thursday from 7pm - 10pm, the station takes programming from Nashville country station WKDF.

Country music artists have also been guest hosts on the station, including Maddie & Tae, Tenille Townes, Elvie Shane, Sam Palladio, Brothers Osborne & Charles Esten.

Presenters
 Dave Berry
 Una Healy
 Ben Earle
 Baylen Leonard
 Lou Nash
 Jennie Longdon
 Hish
 Elaina D. Smith

See also
 Downtown Radio
 Absolute Radio
 Absolute Radio Network

References

External links 
 

Digital-only radio stations
Absolute Radio
Bauer Radio
Radio stations established in 2019
Country radio stations in the United Kingdom